Walter George "Wally" Driver (25 September 1922 – 11 January 1994) was an Australian cricketer. He played two first-class cricket matches for Victoria in 1946–47 and four matches for Western Australia in the 1949–50 season.  Driver toured New Zealand with the Australian team in February and March 1950, but in May 1950 he returned to Melbourne.  He did not play first-class cricket again.

See also
 List of Victoria first-class cricketers
 List of Western Australia first-class cricketers

References

External links

1922 births
1994 deaths
Australian cricketers
Victoria cricketers
Western Australia cricketers
Cricketers from Melbourne